A flight paramedic is a paramedic who provides care to sick and injured patients in an aeromedical environment. Typically a flight paramedic works with a registered nurse, physician, respiratory therapist, or another paramedic. Flight paramedics must have an advanced medical knowledge along with years of clinical experience. Flight paramedics in the United States usually hold certifications such as the FP-C or the CCP-C, while in countries like the United Kingdom, they are typically required to hold a postgraduate certificate in critical care as a minimum, with many holding a master's degree in advanced practice or aeromedical critical care.

Education/training

United States 

Within the US, the minimum requirements for flight paramedics generally include: 

 Licensed as a paramedic by a state Emergency Medical Services (EMS) board
 3-5 years as the lead paramedic in a volume EMS ground service
 Advanced Cardiovascular Life Support, Pediatric Advanced Life Support, Pre-Hospital Trauma Life Support or ITLS

Additional requirements may include:

 Neonatal Resuscitation Program
 Certifications such as the FP-C or CCP-C (usually required within 2 years of commencing employment in the United States)
 Critical care classes such as the CCEMTP by UMBC. 
 Postgraduate certificate or master's degree (United Kingdom/British Commonwealth)

Roles and responsibilities
Roles and responsibilities vary by organisation and country. Typical responsibilities include:
Perform as a member of an aeromedical evacuation team
 Plan and prepare for aeromedical evacuation missions
 Provide in-flight critical care to patients
 Care for patients with both medical and traumatic issues
 Possess advanced understanding of mechanical ventilation, hemodynamic support, vasoactive medications and intensive care
 Possess specialized clinical skills combined with knowledge, theory, education and expertise in hospital and pre-hospital environments
 Perform advanced medical procedures without supervision of a doctor such as rapid sequence intubation, ventilator management, finger thoracostomy/chest tube insertion, central line placement, intra-aortic balloon pump management, pericardiocentesis, titration of vasoactive medications, administration of general anesthetics and paralytics for intubation, as well as sedatives and analgesic medications for pain and anxiety.

See also 
 Aircrew (Flight crew)
 Air medical services
 Certified Flight Paramedic
 Combat medic
 Medic
 Museum of Aerospace Medicine
 Royal Flying Doctor Service of Australia
 Enlisted Medics (U.S. Air Force)
Flight Paramedic certification or FP-C

References

External links 
 International Association of Flight Paramedics

Emergency medical responders
Air ambulance services